Paula Barceló Martín (born 13 March 1996) is a Spanish sailor who has competed in the Optimist, 470 and 49er FX categories. Along with Támara Echegoyen, she won a gold medal at the 2020 49er & 49er FX World Championships.

References

1996 births
Living people
Sportspeople from Palma de Mallorca
Spanish female sailors (sport)
Olympic sailors of Spain
49er FX class sailors
Sailors at the 2020 Summer Olympics – 49er FX
49er FX class world champions
World champions in sailing for Spain